John Nicol (1755-1825) was a Scottish sailor who in 1789 sailed on Lady Juliana, a ship that transported convict women to Port Jackson in New South Wales, Australia. His autobiography, published in 1822, offers a rare first-hand account of the life of an ordinary Georgian sailor.

Life 

Nicol was born at Currie, near Edinburgh, in Scotland. His father was a cooper, and his mother died in childbirth while Nicol was young. He was apprenticed to a cooper, and in 1776 joined the Royal Navy, serving first on HMS Proteus in the North Atlantic. He then served on HMS Surprise, before being discharged at the conclusion of the American War of Independence in 1783.

In the next few years Nicol sailed in a whaling ship in the waters off Greenland, and sailed to the West Indies and China. He also circumnavigated the globe during this period, doing so twice during his lifetime.

In 1789 he left England on Lady Juliana, which was transporting over 200 female convicts to Australia. It was common practice for crew-members to take a 'wife' from the convicts – Nicol's wife, a convicted shoplifter from Lincoln named Sarah Whitlam, bore him a son during the voyage. They were separated on their arrival at Port Jackson in 1790, and Nicol never saw either again. The day after Nicol's departure, Whitelam married another man.

After being discharged following the Peace of Amiens, he returned to Scotland, married his cousin, and resumed work as a carpenter. With the resumption of the Napoleonic Wars, Nicol lived in constant fear of being impressed, and thus left Edinburgh for rural Scotland. Eventually he grew too old to be at risk of impressment, and so travelled to London in search of his naval pension, which he was unable to obtain. He returned to Scotland, where he was so poor that he had to pick scraps of coal from the street in order to keep himself warm.

In 1822, Nicol was approached by John Howell, a 'polyartist' whose numerous inventions included a device for trimming the leaves of books, in addition to a flying machine, and a prototype submarine. Howell published five books that detailed the lives of former soldiers or sailors. His method seems to have involved befriending impoverished men and then noting down their stories; Howell assigned all royalties from publication to the subjects themselves.

Notes

References 

 Baynham, Henry (2004). "Nicol, John (1755–1825)", Oxford Dictionary of National Biography (Oxford University Press), accessed 23 March 2012
 Flannery, Tim (1997). The Life and Adventures of John Nicol, Mariner (Canongate, 2000, British edition).

External links 

 The life and adventures of John Nicol, mariner at Archive.org
 Nicol's obituary in the Gentleman's Magazine (1825, vol. 95, part 2, pp. 472–3).

1755 births
1825 deaths
Scottish sailors